Rugby union at the Pacific Games has been contested since 1963 when included as one of ten sports at the first games held in Suva, Fiji. Rugby sevens is the form of rugby now played at the Pacific Games, with men's and women's tournaments (for 7-a-side teams) included in the current schedule. The women's competition was added for the first time at the 2011 Pacific Games held in Nouméa.

Prior to the late 1990s the men's tournament at the South Pacific Games, as it was then known, was contested by national rugby union teams (i.e. 15-a-side). The shorter tournament structure of rugby sevens being better suited to multi-sports events led to the change of format.

In 2014, Australia and New Zealand were invited to participate in some events for the 2015 Pacific Games, and the Australian women's sevens team was subsequently confirmed as a competitor for the women's tournament in Port Moresby.

Rugby sevens is also played at the Pacific Mini Games, and was included for the first time at Pago Pago in 1997.

Pacific Games

Men's tournament 
The men's tournament is now played as a rugby sevens competition (for 7-a-side teams). From 1963 until 1995 the competition was for national rugby union teams (15-a-side). The first two events in 1963 and 1966 were played as round-robin competitions only and, as such, did not include finals.

Women's tournament 
Rugby sevens for women was added to the Pacific Games schedule in 2011 at Nouméa.

Medal table 
The all-time medal standings for rugby at the Pacific Games, including the South Pacific Games, from 1963–present is collated in the table below. This includes 15s and 7s versions of rugby union and both men's and women's events, but does not include medals from the Mini Games.

Updated to 2019.

Pacific Mini Games

Men's tournaments

Medal table 
The all-time medal standings for rugby at the Pacific Mini Games, including the South Pacific Mini Games, from 1985–present is collated in the table below. This includes 15s and 7s versions of rugby union and both men's and women's events.

See also 
Oceania Sevens
Oceania Women's Sevens
Rugby sevens at the Commonwealth Games
Rugby sevens at the Summer Olympics

Notes

References 

 
Pacific Games
Pac
Pacific Games